This Commission for the Administration of Justice of Malta is the national council of the judiciary of Malta. It is set up under the relevant provisions of the Constitution (art. 101A, last amended in 2016), and is chaired by the President of Malta.

Composition 
The Commission is composed of nine other members including the Chief Justice of Malta (Deputy Chairman), the Attorney General of Malta, two members elected by the judges of the Superior Courts for a period of four years, two members elected by the magistrates of the Inferior Courts for a period of four years, one member appointed by the Prime Minister of Malta for a period of four years and another member nominated by the Leader of the Opposition as well as the President of the Chamber of Advocates. The persons nominated by the Prime Minister and the Leader of the Opposition must be at least forty-five years of age, and enjoy the respect of the public and have a reputation of integrity and honesty.

Functions 

The procedures of the Commission are regulated in terms of the Commission for the Administration of Justice Act (Chapter 369 of the Laws of Malta). The functions of the Commission include the supervision of the workings of all Courts, and proposing recommendations to the Minister responsible for Justice, to ensure the efficient functioning of the Courts. The Commission also advises the Minister on any matter relating to the organisation and administration of justice and formulates and codes of ethics regulating the conduct of members of the judiciary, after consultation with the Committee for Advocates and Legal Procurators.

The Commission has the right to exercise discipline according to law over advocates and legal procurators practising their profession.

The Commission is housed by the Grandmaster's Palace in Valletta.

Subcommittees 
 Judicial Appointments Committee (Art.96A), composed by (a) the Chief Justice; (b) the Attorney General; (c) the Auditor General; (d) the Commissioner for Administrative Investigations (Ombudsman); and (e) the President of the Chamber of Advocates, and tasked with checking the formal compliance of candidate judges and magistrates with the appointment criteria. (see Judiciary of Malta#Appointment)
 Committee for Judges and Magistrates (art. 101B.1), tasked with disciplinary proceedings against members of the judiciary, and composed of three members of the judiciary who are not members of the Commission for the Administration of Justice and who shall be elected from amongst judges and magistrates so however that in disciplinary proceedings against a magistrate two of the three members shall be magistrates and in the case of disciplinary proceedings against a judge two of the three members shall be judges. (see Judiciary of Malta#Discipline)

Current members

The Commission is composed as follows:

President of Malta - George Vella
Chief Justice of Malta - Mark Chetcuti (Deputy Chairman)
Attorney General of Malta - Victoria Buttigieg
Judges' representative 1 - Unknown
Judges' representative 2 - Unknown
Magistrates' representative 1 - Unknown (previously Anthony Vella) 
Magistrates' representative 2 - Unknown
Government's representative - Pawlu Lia 
Opposition's representative - Unknown
President of the Chamber of Advocates - Louis Degabriele 
 Secretary: Deborah Farrugia

References

External links 
 Chapter 369 of the Laws of Malta - Commission for the Administration of Justice
 Times of Malta - What is the Commission for the Administration of Justice? (2012)
 Rafael Vassallo - What Commission? What Administration? What Justice? (2012)

Government agencies of Malta
National councils of the judiciary
Judiciary of Malta